"Bird Dog" is a song written by Boudleaux Bryant and recorded by the Everly Brothers. It was released in 1958 and was a #1 hit on the
Billboard Country Chart for 6 weeks. The song also hit number two on the U.S. Billboard Hot 100 as well as peaking at number two for three weeks on the R&B charts.

Background
The song deals with the singer's dismay that a boy, by the name of Johnny, is trying to take his girlfriend away. The singer calls him a bird dog as a result of his behavior.

The musical structure is relatively unusual in that it has a 12 bar blues stanza and an 8 bar blues chorus.

Personnel
 Don Everly – vocals, guitar
 Phil Everly – vocals, guitar
 Floyd “Lightnin’” Chance – double bass

Charts

All-time charts

Cover versions
In 1958, Morris And Mitch recorded a version in the UK.
In 1966, The Newbeats released a version of the song as a single.
In 1975, English Glam rock band Mud recorded a cover of the song on their album Use Your Imagination which reached #33 on the UK charts
In 1978, the Bellamy Brothers, recorded a cover of the song which reached #86 on the Hot Country Singles chart.

References

1958 songs
1958 singles
1966 singles
Songs written by Felice and Boudleaux Bryant
The Everly Brothers songs
Hep Stars songs
The Newbeats songs
The Bellamy Brothers songs
Cadence Records singles